= Parichehr =

1951 Iranian drama film

- Directed by: Fazlollah Bayegan
- Produced by: Fazlollah Bayegan
- Cinematography: Iraj Farahvashi
- Release date: 1951
- Running time: 90 minutes
- Country: Iran
- Language: Persian

Parichehr is a 1951 Iranian drama film directed by Fazlollah Bayegan.

== Cast ==
- Fazlollah Bayegan
- Rogheyeh Chehreh-Azad
- Ali Tabesh

== Bibliography ==
- Mohammad Ali Issari. Cinema in Iran, 1900-1979. Scarecrow Press, 1989.
